Elbow Pond may refer to:
 
 Elbow Pond (Plymouth, Massachusetts)
 Elbow Pond (New York)